Argyripnus hulleyi, commonly known as Reunion's bristle-mouth fish, is a species of ray-finned fish in the genus Argyripnus found in Reunion.

Etymology
The fish is named  in honor of Percy Alexander Hulley (b. 1941), the Curator of Fishes, at the Iziko South African Museum.

References

Taxa named by Jean-Claude Quéro
Taxa named by Jérôme Spitz
Taxa named by Jean-Jacques Vayne
Fish described in 2009
Sternoptychidae